Armeniș is a commune in Caraș-Severin County, western Romania with a population of 2,718 people. It is composed of five villages: Armeniș, Feneș (Fényes), Plopu, Sat Bătrân (Ófalu) and Sub Margine.

Gallery

References

External links 

 Armeniș Official Site 
 History of Armeniș 
 Study prepares for bison reintroduction in Southern Carpathians, at Armeniș

Communes in Caraș-Severin County
Localities in Romanian Banat
Mining communities in Romania